Emerance Maschmeyer (born October 5, 1994) is a Canadian ice hockey goaltender for Team Bauer, playing from the Montréal hub of the PWHPA. She is a member of Canada women's national ice hockey team (Team Canada), with whom she won the 2021 IIHF Women's World Championship and the 2022 Winter Olympics gold medal. She first made her debut with Team Canada at the 2014 4 Nations Cup.

Playing career
Maschmeyer was the second female goalie to compete in the Brick Tournament in Edmonton. A meeting was set up at the tournament for her to meet Shannon Szabados, and since then, the two have stayed in contact. She played against her brother Brock, who played for the Fort McMurray Oil Barons, and stopped him in a shoot-out. Maschmeyer played two exhibition games during the 2010–11 season with the Lloydminster Bobcats of the AJHL. In an exhibition game versus the Camrose Kodiaks, Maschmeyer posted no goals against and was named game star.

Hockey Canada
Maschmeyer won a gold medal with Team Alberta at the 2011 Canada Winter Games. In addition, she claimed gold at the 2009 Alberta Winter Games. She earned a shutout for Team Canada in the gold medal game at the 2012 IIHF World Women's U18 Championship, a 3–0 triumph over the United States.

Maschmeyer would compete for the Canadian Under-22 national team that competed at the 2017 Nations Cup. In the gold medal game against Finland, Maschmeyer made 17 saves as Canada lost to Finland by a 1–0 tally.

Maschmeyer has appeared in 3 consecutive IIHF World Championship Tournaments for Canada in 2015, 2016 and 2017.  Canada earned silver medals in all three tournaments.

On January 11, 2022, Maschmeyer was named to Canada's 2022 Olympic team.

NCAA
In March 2012, Maschmeyer committed to play for the Harvard Crimson. Maschmeyer made 29 saves for Harvard in the championship game of the 2015 NCAA National Collegiate Women's Ice Hockey Tournament.

Professional career
In the 2015 NWHL Draft, she was selected by the Boston Pride. In April 2016, she registered for the 2016 CWHL Draft and ended up becoming the Calgary Inferno's first-round pick.

Winning the starting goaltender duties, Maschmeyer would earn a spot in the 3rd Canadian Women's Hockey League All-Star Game. In addition, she would gain the start for Calgary in the 2017 Clarkson Cup finals versus Les Canadiennes de Montreal.

Following her release from Canada's Centralization Camp in preparation for the 2018 Winter Games, Maschmeyer would be traded to Les Canadiennes, becoming their starting goaltender. Erin Ambrose, who had also been released from Centralization, would join Maschmeyer in Montreal, having been traded from the Toronto Furies.

The 2018–19 season would see Maschmeyer gain the second All-Star nod of her career, playing with Alex Rigsby for Team Purple in the 4th Canadian Women's Hockey League All-Star Game. Coincidentally, the two would play against each other in the 2019 Clarkson Cup Finals, with Rigsby as the starter for the Calgary Inferno, Maschmeyer's former club. Of note, Calgary would emerge victorious, defeating Maschmeyer and Montreal by a 5–2 count.

Career statistics

NCAA
Harvard

Hockey Canada
IIHF World Championships

CWHL
CWHL

Awards and honours
Nominee, Fort Saskatchewan (AMHL) Most Valuable Player
Gold in the Net Athlete of the Month, January 2011
Fort Saskatchewan (Bantam AAA Boys) All-Star Team (2008–09)
Fort Saskatchewan (Bantam AA Boys) All-Star Team (2007–08)

CWHL
Finalist, 2018–19 CWHL Goaltender of the Year Award
Finalist, 2018–19 Jayna Hefford Trophy

References

External links

1994 births
Living people
Canadian people of German descent
Calgary Inferno players
Canadian expatriate ice hockey players in the United States
Canadian women's ice hockey goaltenders
Harvard Crimson women's ice hockey players
Ice hockey people from Alberta
Les Canadiennes de Montreal players
People from Fort Saskatchewan
Professional Women's Hockey Players Association players
Ice hockey players at the 2022 Winter Olympics
Olympic ice hockey players of Canada
Medalists at the 2022 Winter Olympics
Olympic medalists in ice hockey
Olympic gold medalists for Canada